Mister World 2023 will be the 11th edition of the Mister World competition. Jack Heslewood of England will crown his successor at the end of the event.

Contestants
As of 26 February 2023, 20 contestants have been confirmed:

Upcoming pageants

Notes

Crossovers
Mister Tourism World
2017:  – Joshua Benedict (Top 4)

Manhunt International
2022:  – Hanniel Espinoza (Top 10)

Mister Global
2022:  – Nutan Shrestha

Mister Supranational
2023:  – Franco Luciano Touceda (TBA)

References

External links
 

Mister World
2023 beauty pageants